Napeogenes quadrilis is a species of butterfly of the family Nymphalidae. It is found in Ecuador.

References

Butterflies described in 1903
Ithomiini
Nymphalidae of South America
Taxa named by Richard Haensch